Satyashodhak Samaj (Truth-seekers' Society) was a social reform society founded by Jyotiba Phule in Pune, Maharashtra, on 24 September 1873. It espoused a mission of education and increased social rights and political access for underprivileged groups, focused especially on women, peasants, and Dalits, in Maharashtra. Jyotirao's wife Savitribai was the head of women's section of the society. The Samaj disbanded during the 1930s as leaders left to join the Indian National Congress party.

Early years  
Phule was born into a Mali family in 1827 and was educated at a Christian missionary school. After he completed his own education, he and his wife focused on expanding educational opportunities for low caste communities. The Protestant Christian tilt of Phule's education strongly affected the theoretical underpinnings of the Satyashodhak Samaj. The Satyashodhak movement espoused a framework that could be called religious. It emphasized the equality inherent in all men, as bestowed upon them by a divine creator. It maintained faith in one god, rejected any kind of intermediary between god and man (referring here to the necessity of priests in religious rituals), and rejected the caste system. The Samaj also developed arguments against priestly social and political superiority.

Initially, Phule was attracted towards Arya Samaj, Prarthana Samaj and Poona Sarvajanik Sabha but he mistrusted them to successfully bring more rights for lower castes. This mistrust caused Phule to establish Satyashodhak Samaj. The Samaj argues that priestly dominance is not an inherent trait; rather, the varnas were manufactured in a strategic move meant to establish and protect priestly social standing. The artificial origins of the system gave low caste communities the right to contest it at the time. The Samaj insisted that, in order to reclaim their social standing, low caste groups should oppose priests as middleman between men and god in religious rituals and ceremonies. The Samaj also advocated for social changes that went against prevalent traditions, including less expensive weddings, inter-caste marriages, the end of child marriage, and the right of the widow to remarry.

The Samaj's original commitment to education and charitable activities was combined with the espousal of this anti-brahman rhetoric as the organization spread across Maharashtra. The organization attracted individuals of all castes, religions, and professions, including Brahmins, Muslims, lawyers, merchants, peasants, land-owners, agricultural laborers, Rajputs, untouchables, and government officials. Phule thought that the Samaj could uplift disadvantaged communities through collective action and organized movement, and the first step to doing so was educating low caste individuals about the misdeeds of the Brahmans. In order to spread their ideas more effectively, the Samaj published the Deenbandhu newspaper from 1877 to 1897. In addition, the Samaj emphasized the special importance of English education because it played a vital role in building occupational skills and served as the basis for the intellectual emancipation of disadvantaged groups. Phule also believed that an English education might open opportunities for employment with the British Government. 

The Samaj's view of the colonial government went against nationalist groups at the time. They cultivated relations with British officials in order to seek benefits for low caste groups and saw the British government as the most likely power to offer low caste groups fair treatment. In fact, when Phule was criticized by Brahmans about his unwillingness to fight for national liberation, he responded that Shudras should expand their scope of freedom by directing their complaints to a benevolent, if misguided, British government.

Influence on the Peasant Revolts and the non-Brahman Movement 
The Samaj's critiques of Brahmanical tradition in Maharashtra formed the basis for a peasant-based mass movement against the shetji-bhatji class of intelligentsia and the moneylender-landlord. In the early 20th century, the Samaj faced difficulty in connecting with the peasant areas of Maharashtra. Finding lectures ineffective, the Samaj turned to tamashas, popular folk dramas, to communicate their messages. Satyashodhak tamashas followed the traditional format but subverted the pro-Brahman elements of the dramas. They began with an invocation to Ganpati, a traditional brahman deity, but added an explanation that the actual meaning of the word came from gan (people) and pati (leader). The invocation to Ganpati was therefore an invocation to the people as a source of rule. The plays continued with a discussion of brahman tyranny, followed by a story about the efforts of brahmans to cheat peasants. These Satyashodhak tamashas were also used by non-brahman elites for political purposes, including as election propaganda.

Through the tamashas, the Samaj was able to connect its activities and those of non-Brahman leaders with general peasant interests. The inculcation of Satyashodhak and non-Brahman ideology in the peasant masses led to rebellion in some parts of Maharashtra. In Satara in 1919, tenants revolted against their brahman landlords in coordination with the Samaj's anti-religious ideology. The Vijayi Maratha newspaper describes the event: “Brahman land rent had greatly soared… no profit remained to the peasants – then they decided they didn’t want such a low contract on Brahman lands. In this way, the Satyashodhak Samaj freed them from every type of Brahman slavery.” The process of rebellion in other cities in Maharashtra took a similar shape – the Satyashodhak Samaj arrived with its ideology and its tamashas that mocked brahman superiority. Peasants stopped relying on brahmans for religious ceremonies, interrupted brahman ceremonies, violated temples, and broke idols. Poor, low caste peasants had accepted a social ideology which argued that their status was not legitimized in any religious texts and gave them the right to revolt against their brahman landlords in order to achieve a better lifestyle. These peasant revolts in Maharashtra showed that the Satyashodhak Samaj's ideology was salient to common people and capable of stimulating group action.

Criticism of the Samaj 
While the Samaj found great allies in low caste groups, Brahmans found Phule’s efforts to be sacrilegious and anti-nationalist. They fought back against the idea of brahmans as opportunistic invaders and greedy elites. One particular critic, Vishnushashtri Chiplunkar, argued that Brahmans had always respected lower-caste individuals. He claimed that Brahmans respected the great saints and holy men who were born into the lowest castes and elevated to positions of respect by merit. He argued that the Samaj was simply trying to expose Brahmans in an attempt to gain favor with the British colonial government and gain some small rights. To critics like Chiplunkar, the Samaj’s attempts to gain social and political rights for Shudras and women by lobbying the colonial government were seen as begging India’s oppressors to help them reject Hindu tradition. The upper-caste leaders of Maharashtra disliked the Samaj’s friendly relations with Christian missionaries and its appeals to the British Raj and so treated the organization with scorn.

Brahmans also questioned the religious framework of the Satyashodhak Samaj, noting the Christian ties inherent in the Satyashodhak belief that all beings were granted universal rights at birth by a generous and loving creator. Brahmans argued that Phule was attempting to make a new religion, and that it seemed to lack any ethical or theological purpose. They asserted that the claims that Phule made lacked consistency. In response to his argument that brahmans were Aryan invaders who established and enforced a religion and social system to benefit them and keep them in power, they argued that Phule did not have the authority to rewrite history. For how could he go against the writings of the Ramayana and Bhagavad Gita, and who was he to declare the truth of the alternate history he had created? Chiplunkar declared that Phule was luring his worshippers into what would ultimately be a fruitless search after truth.

Revival under Shahu 

The non-Brahmin movement, that was embodied in Satyashodhak Samaj, had not made much difference to any sections of the society in the 19th century and languished after the death of Phule. However, it was revived in the early 20th century by the Maratha ruler of the princely state of Kolhapur, Shahu Maharaj. In 1902, Shahu reserved 50 per cent civil service posts in Kolhapur state for all communities other than Brahmins, Prabhus and Parsi. He also sponsored religious ceremonies that did not need a Brahmin priest to officiate. By the 1920s, the samaj had established strong roots among the rural masses in Western Maharashtra and Vidarbha and took a strong economic overtone in its message. At that time the organization styled itself the representative of the Bahujan samaj. It also defined the Brahmins, merchants and moneylenders as the oppressors of the masses. The Samaj also
conducted activities in Satara District, Kolhapur State and other places in this area that were designed to harass Brahmins, and to drive them from their positions as priests, government officials, money-lenders, and teachers in the rural areas.
Prior to 1920s, the samaj opposed the Indian national movement because it was a movement led by the elites.
Later followers of the Samaj during 20th century included educationalist Bhaurao Patil and Maratha leaders such as Keshavrao Jedhe, Nana Patil, Khanderao Bagal and Madhavrao Bagal. By the 1930s, given the mass movement nature of the Congress party under Mahatma Gandhi, the samaj leaders such as Jedhe joined the Congress, and the samaj activities withered away.

Legacy 
The doctrine of the Samaj left a major impact on India's intellectual and political spheres, especially in relation to non-brahman and Dalit politics. The non-Brahman movement owed a great deal to the Satyashodhak doctrines of universal rights and equality and the Samaj's arguments against brahman domination of social, religious, and political life. The Dalit political movement, which was separate from the non-Brahman one (as the non-Brahman movement did not often emphasize the particular political and social difficulties associated with the Dalit experience), continued to be affected by Phule's teachings into the early twentieth century.

References 
Notes

Citations

Further reading 

 
Anti-caste movements
Defunct Hindu organizations
1873 establishments in India
Religious organizations established in 1873
Hindu new religious movements
Hindu organisations based in India
Hinduism in Maharashtra
Jyotirao Phule